Wedding Night in Paradise (German: Hochzeitsnacht im Paradis) is an operetta in eight scenes. Book by Heinz Hentschke, lyrics by Gunther Schwenn and music by Friedrich Schröder. It was premièred in Berlin at the Metropol Theater on September 24, 1942. It was filmed several times in German and several other languages.

Adaptations
 Wedding Night In Paradise, a 1950 West German film directed by Géza von Bolváry 
 Wedding Night In Paradise, a 1962 Austrian film directed by Paul Martin

References

Bibliography
 Daniel Meyer-Dinkgrafe. Boulevard Comedy Theatre in Germany. Cambridge Scholars Publishing, 2009.

1942 operas
German-language operettas